The Academia Paulista de Letras (Portuguese: Academy of Literature of São Paulo) is a non-profit organization with the objective of promoting Brazilian literature. The Academia Paulista de Letras was founded on November 27, 1909 by Joaquim José de Carvalho, who served as the organization's first Secretary General.

Writer José Geraldo Vieira was an active member.

References

External links
 Official Website (Portuguese)

Brazilian literature
Non-profit organisations based in Brazil